OK Go is the debut studio album by American rock band OK Go. It was released in September 2002. The cover was created by designer Stefan Sagmeister.

The album debuted at number 107 on Billboard 200, and number one on Billboard Top Heatseekers Chart.

Track listing

Appearances in other media
"Get Over It" was featured on the soundtrack of the video games Triple Play Baseball 2002 and Madden NFL 2003. It was also featured in the 2015 movie Sleeping With Other People. "Don't Ask Me" was featured on the soundtrack of the video game MVP Baseball 2003, trailers for Just Friends and Good Luck Chuck (and also "You're So Damn Hot"), and the movie Catch That Kid. "You're So Damn Hot" was used on an episode of The O.C.. It also appeared in a television commercial advertising campaign for Payless Shoes in 2006, and in ads for ABC's television show Castle.

==Personnel==
OK Go
Damian Kulash Jr. – lead vocals, guitar, programming, percussion
Tim Nordwind – bass, vocals, lead vocals on track 9
Andy Duncan – guitar, keyboard, vocals
Dan Konopka – drums

Production
 Andrew Slater – executive producer
 Howard Willing – producer, engineer
 Dave Trumfio – producer, engineer
 Ted Jensen mastering
 Tom lord-alge mixing

Charts

References

External links
 

2002 debut albums
OK Go albums
Capitol Records albums
Albums with cover art by Stefan Sagmeister